Collins Mansion, also known as the Joseph Collins House, is a historic home located in West Goshen Township, Chester County, Pennsylvania. It was built in 1727, and is a -story stone dwelling with a serpentine stone facade and fieldstone sidewalls. It was extensively renovated in 1758–1760.  It is considered the oldest dwelling in West Chester.

It was listed on the National Register of Historic Places in 1972.

References

External links
 Joseph Collins House, 633 Goshen Road (West Goshen Township), West Chester, Chester County, PA: 8 photos, 6 data pages, and 1 photo caption page at Historic American Buildings Survey

Historic American Buildings Survey in Pennsylvania
Houses on the National Register of Historic Places in Pennsylvania
Houses completed in 1727
Houses in Chester County, Pennsylvania
National Register of Historic Places in Chester County, Pennsylvania
West Goshen Township, Chester County, Pennsylvania
1727 establishments in Pennsylvania